Aerotrain may refer to:
 Aérotrain, a hovercraft train developed in France
 AeroTrain, an tiltrotor aircraft proposed by Karem Aircraft
 Aerotrain (GM), a passenger train built by General Motors Electro-Motive Division
 AeroTrain (Washington Dulles International Airport), an automated people mover at Washington Dulles International Airport
 Aerotrain (KLIA), an automated people mover in Kuala Lumpur International Airport, Malaysia
 Aerotrén, an automated people mover at Mexico City International Airport